Chief George Baptist Ayodola Coker (27 January 1917 – 7 February 1991) was a Judge of the Nigerian Supreme Court, serving from 1964 until 1975. He was an author of two books: Family Property among the Yorubas, and a lecture 
series, Freedom and Justice.

He was the Olori Eyo of the Adimu Eyo cultural masquerade in the Nigerian chieftaincy system.

Life
A Saro, Coker was born in Lagos as the son of George Baptist Coker. He was educated at Olowogbowo Wesleyan Primary School, Lagos from 1924 to 1928 and he then attended Methodist Boys High School, Lagos from 1929 to 1931, he finished his secondary education as one of the foundational students of Igbobi College. Thereafter, he worked briefly as a civil servant and later as a teacher. He later proceeded to London to earn a law degree and was called to the bar in 1947. He obtained a Ph.D. in law in 1955. Coker had a lucrative law practice in Lagos before he was appointed to the bench of High Court of Lagos in 1958.

In 1962, during a political crisis in the Western region of Nigeria, Coker was appointed by Moses Majekodunmi, the sole administrator of the region to chair a commission of enquiry into the affairs of some statutory corporations. The commission was viewed by some as an instrument to discredit the Awolowo faction of the Action Group. However, in the final report of the enquiry, it found Awolowo culpable in the diversion of regional funds to finance the Action Group but exonerated Akintola, which made it easier for the latter to be reinstated as Premier of the region. He became a justice of the Nigerian Supreme Court in 1964. At the apex court, Coker was notable for his judgements in stay of execution pending judgement cases. Two notable cases of the nature were Vaswani v Savalakh and Utilgas Nigerian And Overseas Gas Co. Ltd.v. Pan African Bank Ltd.

Coker was a member of the Methodist Church in Tinubu, Lagos.

References

Supreme Court of Nigeria justices
20th-century Nigerian lawyers
Lawyers from Lagos
Methodist Boys' High School alumni
Igbobi College alumni
1917 births
1991 deaths